The Diary of Anne Frank is a 1967 TV film based on the posthumously published 1947 book The Diary of a Young Girl by Anne Frank. The teleplay was directed by Alex Segal and it was adapted by James Lee from the 1955 play of the same name by Albert Hackett and Frances Goodrich. The film starred Max von Sydow, Diana Davila, Peter Beiger, Theodore Bikel and Lilli Palmer.

Summary
In 1942, the Netherlands, a Nazi-occupied country, has become a place where Jews are being captured and murdered by the Nazis. Otto Frank (Max von Sydow) and his family go into hiding in the office building of his company, Opekta, assisted by his Christian friends and co-workers: Victor Kugler, Johannes Kleiman, Miep Santrouschitz-Gies and Bep Voskuijl. During this uncomfortable time in hiding, Otto's teenage daughter, Anne Frank (Diana Davila), describes in her diary the unbearable circumstances of life inside the "annex", as well as the injustices occurring in the world outside.

Cast
 Diana Davila as Anne Frank
 Max von Sydow as Otto Frank
 Lilli Palmer as Edith Frank
 Marisa Pavan as Margot Frank
 Theodore Bikel as Hans van Daan
 Viveca Lindfors as Petronella van Daan
 Peter Beiger as Peter van Daan
 Donald Pleasence as Albert Dussel
 Suzanne Grossman as Miep
 Dave Anor as Mr. Kraler

See also
List of Holocaust films
List of films about Anne Frank
Anne Frank Remembered, a 1995 TV documentary about Anne Frank
The Attic: The Hiding of Anne Frank, a 1988 TV miniseries about Anne Frank
Anne Frank: The Whole Story, a 2001 TV miniseries about Anne Frank

References

External links

American television films
Films about Anne Frank
Films directed by Alex Segal
Holocaust films
1967 television films
1967 films
The Holocaust in television